HSSE may refer to:
 Headspace sorptive extraction
 Health, Safety, Security and Environmental, a department of bigger firms
 a type of high-speed steel, see High-speed steel#Cobalt High Speed Steels (HSS)
 Health, safety, security and the environment, a term used in the petroleum industry, for the general issue see Environment, health and safety